Barney Howard (born 11 November 1941) is a former Australian rules footballer who played for the North Melbourne Football Club in the Victorian Football League (VFL).

Notes

External links 

Living people
1941 births
Australian rules footballers from Tasmania
North Melbourne Football Club players
Ulverstone Football Club players